Susan Hughes (born 1960) is a Canadian author of children's books. She is a freelance editor and writer. She provides manuscript evaluation and coaching services for writers.

Early life
Susan Hughes went to junior high at Glenview Senior Public School and then high school at Lawrence Park Collegiate Institute. She studied English literature for one year at Queen's University and then completed three more years at the University of Toronto. Hughes got a summer job at a children's publishing company, Crabtree Publishing, where she learned about writing, researching, editing, proof-reading, and working as a team. Hughes worked for a year with Crabtree and then began freelancing as an editor and writer after she graduated, while also working on her own books.

Career
Susan is the award-winning author of 30 children's books, fiction and non-fiction, including board books, picture books, chapter books, middle-grade novels, a non-fiction graphic MG book, and YA.  She is delighted that two of her books have won the Norma Fleck Award for Canadian Children's Non-fiction: CASE CLOSED? NINE MYSTERIES UNLOCKED BY MODERN SCIENCE (Kids Can, 2010), illustrated by Michael Wandelmeier, which won the award in 2011, and OFF TO CLASS: INCREDIBLE AND UNUSUAL SCHOOLS AROUND THE WORLD (Owl Kids, 2011) which won the award in 2012. Hughes' books have been translated into over seven languages.

She has been an adjudicator for several children's writing competitions, including those sponsored by CANSCAIP and the Writers Union of Canada. She has adjudicated for both the short story and poetry categories for the Hamilton Literary Awards (2015, 2012). She had fun as a volunteer competitor (author) in the KidLitQuiz (2014); was honored to be an adjudicator for the CNIB Library Braille Creative Writing Contest, 2014; and the junior and senior speech contest for the TDSB (2013). She was a mentor for the Read Liberia (2013) and Read Sierra Leone (2012) projects for CODE. She was one of four Writers-in-Residence for the Toronto District School Board (2012-2013).

Bibliography
What Happens Next Owl Kids, 2018 
Walking in the City with Jane: A Story of Jane Jacobs Kids Can Press, 2018
"TIME TO ... series," including Bath Time, Nap Time, Play Time Annick Press, 2017  
Up! How Families around the World Carry Their Little Ones Owl Kids, 2017 
Making Canada Home: How Immigrants Shaped This Country  Owl Kids, 2016 
Maggie McGillicuddy's Eye for Trouble Kids Can Press, 2016 
"THE PUPPY COLLECTION series," including #1 Bailey's Visit and #2 Riley Knows Best (2013); #3 Murphy Helps Out and #4 Bijou Needs a Home (2014); #5 Piper’s First Show and #6 Cricket’s Close Call (2015); #7 Houdini's Escape and #8 Cinnamon All Alone (2016) Scholastic Canada 
"Four Seasons of Patrick" Red Deer Press, 2013
"The Island Horse   Kids Can Press, 2012
 Off to Class: Incredible and Unusual Schools around the World   Owl Kids, 2011
 Case Closed? Nine Mysteries Unlocked by Modern Science   Kids Can Press, 2010
 Virginia   Kids Can Press, 2010
  Canada Close Up series. Scholastic Canada, including 'Canadian Celebrations,' 2012, 'Canada's Birds,' 2010, 'Canada Plays Sports,' 2009, and 'Canada Festivals,' 2008
 No Girls Allowed: Tales of Daring Women Dressed as Men for Love, Freedom and Adventure (ill. Willow Dawson)   Kids Can Press, 2008
 Raise Your Voice, Lend a Hand, Change the World   Scholastic Canada, 2007
 Earth to Audrey   Kids Can Press, 2005
 Coming to Canada   Maple Tree Press, 2005
 WILD PAWS series (Scholastic Canada), including 'Bobcat Rescue' (2003), 'The Lonely Wolf Pup' (2003), 'Bunnies in Trouble' (2004), Orphaned Beluga (2004), and 'Cubs All Alone' (2004)
 Lester Pearson: The Canadians   Fitzhenry Whiteside, 2004
 Cuba. The Culture, "Cuba: The Land" and "Cuba: The People," Crabtree, 2004
 Let's Call It Canada: Amazing Stories of Canadian Place Names   Maple Tree Press, 2003
 Canada Invents   Owl Kids, 2002
 The Not-Quite World Famous Scientist   Fitzhenry Whiteside, 2002
 The Science and Story of Titanic (Susan Hughes and Steve Santini)   Somerville House, 1999
 Megalodon: The Prehistoric Shark  (Stephen Cumbaa and Susan Hughes) Somerville House, 1998
 We Celebrate Valentine's Day and We Celebrate Winter" (1994); We Celebrate Family Days, We Celebrate Hanukkah and We Celebrate the Harvest (1993), Crabtree
 Anything Can Happen Doubleday Canada, 1992
 The Environmental Detective (Susan Hughes and Doug Herridge) Somerville House Press, 1991

References

External links
Personal website: http://www.susanhughes.ca

Interview: https://web.archive.org/web/20150621185600/http://www.munchkinsandmanuscripts.com/2011/01/interview-with-susan-hughes-and-give.html

Radio interview with Shelagh Rogers on CBC The Next Chapter: https://www.cbc.ca/radio/thenextchapter/full-episode-oct-22-2018-1.4867401/susan-hughes-on-illustrating-the-life-of-city-champion-jane-jacobs-in-a-way-kids-can-appreciate-1.4867433

TV interview with Global TVhttps://globalnews.ca/video/4184237/the-legacy-of-jane-jacobs about Walking in the City with Jane: A Story of Jane Jacobs:

Canadian children's writers
Living people
1960 births